Omm ol Gharib-e Kuchek (also Romanized as Omm ol Gharīb-e Kūchek; also known as Omm-e Gharīb, Omm-e Gharīb-e Kūchek, Omm ol Qorb, Omm ol Qorībeh, and Umm al Gharab) is a village in Veys Rural District, Veys District, Bavi County, Khuzestan Province, Iran. At the 2006 census, its population was 30, in 7 families.

References 

Populated places in Bavi County